Bowser is a community on the east coast of Vancouver Island in British Columbia, Canada. It has a population of 1,729. Bowser is in the Regional District of Nanaimo and in its Electoral Area H, one of eight in the District. The community was named after William J. Bowser, premier of British Columbia from 1915 to 1916.

Bowser's local hotel was famous in the 1930s for a dog trained by his owners to deliver beer bottles to tables, receive the payment, and deliver change, a feat listed in "Ripley's Believe It or Not!".

Bowser has lent its name to a soil series which is widespread on eastern Vancouver Island. Bowser loamy sand is mapped under the whole community.

Bowser is served by the coast-spanning Island Highway and the Island Rail Corridor.

References

Sources 
"Bowser." Encyclopedia of British Columbia. 2000

External links

Populated places in the Regional District of Nanaimo